Erwin Keil (born 30 November 1980) is a football striker from Austria currently playing for SV Kuchl.

Career
He has previously played for SV Austria Salzburg, FC Puch, SV Grödig, TSV St. Johann and FC Pinzgau Saalfelden.

External links
 

1980 births
Living people
Austrian footballers
Association football forwards
FC Red Bull Salzburg players
SV Grödig players
TSV St. Johann im Pongau players
Austrian Football Bundesliga players